The Wisconsin School for the Blind and Visually Impaired (WSBVI) is a state school that specializes in teaching the visually impaired. It is operated by the Wisconsin Center for the Blind and Visually Impaired (WCBVI), a unit of the Wisconsin Department of Public Instruction. Founded in 1849, the school is located in Janesville, Wisconsin.

Originally known as the Wisconsin Institute for the Education of the Blind, the school changed its name in 1885 to the Wisconsin School for the Blind. In 1945 it became the Wisconsin School for the Visually Handicapped, and in 2012 it was renamed the Wisconsin School for the Blind and Visually Impaired.

Wisconsin youth who are blind or visually impaired are eligible to attend the regular school year program of the Wisconsin School for the Blind and Visually Impaired, which operates as part of the free public school system of the state. WSBVI is a residential school whose curriculum is both academic and applied. The school maintains a core academic curriculum, along with teaching functional life skills, including specialized skills related to blindness, vocational skills, physical education and recreation, and personal management. WSBVI cooperates with the Janesville Public School System and Blackhawk Technical College. Most of the students in the WSBVI program have a disability in addition to visual impairment.

The school has a residential life, as in a dormitory program.

Notable alumni
John Kostuck, businessman/piano tuner, legislator
Reino A. Perala, lawyer, hotel owner, legislator

References

External links
 Wisconsin School for the Blind and Visually Impaired official website
 Wisconsin Center for the Blind and Visually Impaired
 Historic photos at the Wisconsin Historical Society
 History of the Wisconsin School for the Blind and Visually Impaired

Public high schools in Wisconsin
Public middle schools in Wisconsin
Public elementary schools in Wisconsin
Buildings and structures in Janesville, Wisconsin
Education in Rock County, Wisconsin
Schools for the blind in the United States
Public K-12 schools in the United States
Public boarding schools in the United States
Boarding schools in Wisconsin